Ol' Man Adam an' His Chillun is a collection of pseudo-African American folk tales written by author Roark Bradford and published in the United Kingdom and the United States in 1928. It was compared to the tales about Uncle Remus and had moderate success, the Chicago Post called it "howlingly funny". Poet Sterling Brown criticized the way it depicted African Americans.

The book was soon adapted to a play The Green Pastures by Marc Connelly which won the 1930 Pulitzer Prize for Drama. This was later made into the 1936 movie The Green Pastures.

Black actor Mantan Moreland adapted it for Caedmon Records based on material in the book.

References

1928 books
Books adapted into plays
Fantasy anthologies
Books adapted into films
Harper & Brothers books